Marco Pech is a Belizean politician for the United Democratic Party. In 2010, he was appointed as the Minister of State for Natural Resources.

He was President of the Senate from March 2012 to September 2015.

External links
 UDP cabinet list

References

Year of birth missing (living people)
Living people
United Democratic Party (Belize) politicians
Government ministers of Belize
Members of the Belize House of Representatives for Orange Walk South
Members of the Senate (Belize)